Anita Coleman is an Indian American academic librarian, faculty and researcher in digital libraries. Anita Coleman is also the founder of an interdisciplinary open access repository, dLIST - Digital Library of Information Science and Technology.

Awards

2007 Mover and Shaker (Library Journal)

2007 Spring Outstanding Teacher (University of Arizona, School of Information Resources and Library Science)

1996-2007 Professional  Service - Learning Resources Association of the California Community Colleges.

2006 Professional Service (Library of Congress and American Library Association Association for Library Cataloging and Technical Services)

1998 Research - California Academic & Research Libraries

Publications 

1996. 
1996. The H-Journal: A Tool to Support Information Work. The New Review of Hypermedia and Multimedia Applications and Research, Vol. 2, pp. 89 – 105.
2001. 
2001. 
2002. 
2002. Interdisciplinarity: The Road Ahead for Digital Library Education. D-Lib Magazine. Interdisciplinarity: The Road Ahead for Education in Digital Libraries
2002. The Design and Evaluation of Interactivities in a Digital Library. D-Lib Magazine. The Design and Evaluation of Interactivities in a Digital Library
2002. Interactional Digital Libraries. With Maliaca Oxnam. Journal of Digital Information.
2003. How Can Classificatory Structures be used to improve science education? With Olha Buchel. Learning Resources & Technical Services Vol. 42, Iss. 1, pp. 4 – 15. 
2004. "A Code for Classifiers": Whatever Happened to Merrill's Code? Knowledge Organization Vol. 31, pp. 161 – 76.
2004. Guide to Selecting and Cataloging Quality WWW Resources for the Small Library. Fairfield, CA; Learning Resources Association of California Community Colleges.
2004. Bricoleurs: exploring digital library evaluation as participant interactions, research, and processes. With Laura M Bartolo, Casey Jones. Joint Conference on Digital Libraries. 
2004. Digital Libraries and User Needs: Negotiating the Future. With Tamara Sumner. Journal of Digital Information.
2005. 
2005. Open Access Federation for Library and Information Science. D-Lib Magazine. Open Access Federation for Library and Information Science:  dLIST and DL-Harvest
2005. 
2005. Impact: the last frontier in digital library evaluation. With Laura M Bartolo, Casey Jones. Joint Conference on Digital Libraries.  
2005. Copyright transfer agreements and self-archiving. With Cheryl Knott Malone. Joint Conference on Digital Libraries.
2006. 
2006. A Common Sense Approach to Defining Data, Information, and Metadata. With Dimitri Dervos. Knowledge Organization for a Global Learning Society: Advances in Knowledge Organization. 
2006. 
2007. Self-Archiving and the Copyright Transfer Agreements of ISI-Ranked Library and Information Science Journals. Journal of the American Society for Information Science and Technology Vol. 58 Iss. 2, pp. 286–296.
2007. Assessing the Value of a Journal beyond the Impact Factor. Journal of the American Society for Information Science and Technology, Vol. 58, Iss. 2, pp. 286 – 296.

References

American librarians
American women librarians
Living people
Year of birth missing (living people)
21st-century American women